Juncus dudleyi is a widespread species of rush (genus Juncus), native to North America, and introduced to northern South America, Japan, Great Britain and central Europe. Its diploid chromosome number is 2n=80.

References

dudleyi
Flora of North America
Plants described in 1900